Ballard Down is an area of chalk downland on the Purbeck Hills in the English county of Dorset. The hills meet the English Channel here, and Ballard Down forms a headland, Ballard Point, between Studland Bay to the north and Swanage Bay to the south. The chalk here forms part of a system of chalk downlands in southern England, and once formed a continuous ridge between what is now west Dorset and the present day Isle of Wight. Old Harry Rocks, just offshore from the dip slope of the down, and The Needles on the westernmost tip of the Isle of Wight, are remnants of this ridge. The scarp slope of the down faces south, over Swanage, meeting the sea as Ballard Cliff.

The down was an area of calcareous grassland for up to 1000 years until World War II, when there was a sudden rise in the need for arable agricultural land. The down is now owned by the National Trust, and has largely been returned to grassland. The National Trust allows grazing on the down to prevent it becoming a natural beech woodland climax community.

The obelisk at Ballard Down commemorates the provision of a new supply of drinking water for Swanage in 1883. Erected in 1892 by George Burt, it was taken down in 1941 as it was a landmark that might have aided enemy aircraft during World War II, but was re-erected in 1952.

Ballard Down forms the easternmost part of the Jurassic Coast World Heritage Site.

The BBC's adaptation of EM Forster's novel 'Howards End' (2017) used Ballard Down as a location.

References 

Isle of Purbeck
Hills of Dorset
Nature reserves in Dorset
National nature reserves in England
Jurassic Coast

National Trust properties in Dorset
Grade I listed buildings in Dorset